Two Weeks Notice is a 2002 American romantic comedy film written and directed by Marc Lawrence and starring Hugh Grant and Sandra Bullock. Although critical response was mixed, the film was successful at the box office.

Plot 

Lucy Kelson is an intelligent, highly competent liberal lawyer who specializes in historic preservation, environmental law, and pro bono causes in New York City. George Wade is an arrogant, needy billionaire real estate developer and stylish womanizing playboy, who is also quite naïve. Lucy's hard work and devotion to others contrasts sharply with George's childish recklessness and greed.

Lucy meets George in an attempt to stop the destruction of the Coney Island community center from her childhood. Discovering she graduated from prestigious Harvard law school, he offers to hire her to replace his old Chief Counsel, overlooking their opposing views of real estate development. She decides the benefits he offers for discretionary funding for community causes she espouses outweighs the negatives, especially as he promises to protect the community center.

Soon, she finds what he really requires is advice in all aspects of his life. She regretfully becomes his indispensable assistant, and he calls her for every little thing at all hours. At a friend's wedding, her cell phone loudly rings and disrupts the proceedings before she responds to his urgent page. When she discovers the "emergency" he needs her advice on is his attire to an important event, she gives him her two weeks' notice of resignation. Yet, her departure is not so easy.

Lucy looks for work at other firms, but everyone says no because George has called in advance asking them not to hire her, so he can keep her on. Eventually, he gives in, and she offers to help him find a replacement, but unaware of how close and interdependent they have become. They act like an old married couple at a restaurant, able to simultaneously carry out a conversation while involuntarily exchanging food out of habit from knowing each other's food preferences.

When potential interviewee June Carver shows up without an appointment seeking the position, Lucy speaks to her, but is concerned June lacks real estate experience. When George sees June he is immediately attracted and is ready to hire her on the spot, with seemingly disregards Lucy's concerns. Rather than look the other way and let her soon-to-be-former boss deal with the foolishness of his sexist hiring practices, Lucy instead becomes increasingly concerned and competitive with her replacement. When George invites June to business social events that formerly would be just between George and Lucy, Lucy increasingly perceives the business events to be more like dates, and is surprised June is intruding on them.

Lucy finds out despite George's promise, the community center is going to be knocked down and challenges him on his apparent betrayal.  She arrives at his hotel to confront him and finds June and George in his apartment in lingerie during a game of "strip chess". George confronts her the next day, her last day, where Lucy reminds him he promised her to spare the community center.  Lucy leaves after George accuses her of being a saint, making everyone else look bad because they are humans who make mistakes.

After she is gone, George realizes his time with her has demonstrated he needs to change. Meanwhile, in her new job, Lucy finds she misses him. He goes in search for her and reveals he decided to keep his promise to her. Lucy initially rebuffs him but then returns and they declare their feelings. George reveals he resigned.

In the DVD version of the film, an unreleased wedding scene of George and Lucy was featured. George and Lucy were married at the community center attended by family and friends.

Cast 

 Hugh Grant as George Wade
 Sandra Bullock as Lucy Kelson
 Alicia Witt as June Carver
 Francie Swift as Lauren Wade
 Dana Ivey as Ruth Kelson
 Robert Klein as Larry Kelson
 Jason Antoon as Norman
 Heather Burns as Meryl Brooks
 David Haig as Howard Wade
 Dorian Missick as Tony
 Joseph Badalucco Jr. as Joseph Badalucco
 Jonathan Dokuchitz as Tom Brooks
 Sharon Wilkins as Polly St. Clair
 Bill Bowers as Mime
 Adam LeFevre as RV Man
 Veanne Cox as Melanie Corman
 Janine LaManna as Elaine Cominsky
 Iraida Polanco as Rosario
 Charlotte Maier as Helen Wade
 Katheryn Winnick as Tiffany
 Donald Trump as himself
 Norah Jones as herself
 Mike Piazza as himself

Production  
Director Marc Lawrence suffered headaches, sinus infections, a root canal, and a slipped disc, while making the film. Lawrence previously wrote the films Forces of Nature and Miss Congeniality, which starred Bullock, and it was on the latter film where he asked her to look at his unfinished script. Bullock liked it enough to star in and produce the film. Grant was first choice for the part, he and Bullock had already wanted to work together. Lawrence hoped the film would be different enough for Grant, not the same as his Notting Hill character, but not as unpleasant as his Bridget Jones's Diary character. Filming took place in New York City, and was noted as the first Hollywood production to take place after the September 11 attacks.

Reception

Box office 
The film opened at number 2 at the U.S. Box office, earning USD14,328,494 in its opening weekend, behind The Lord of the Rings: The Two Towers. It had a total domestic gross of $93,354,851 and an overall worldwide gross of $199,043,242.

Critical response 
On Rotten Tomatoes, the film has an approval rating of 42% based on 123 reviews, with an average rating of 5.6/10. The site's critics consensus reads: "Though Two Weeks Notice has nothing new to add to the crowded genre, Hugh Grant and Sandra Bullock make the movie a pleasant, if predictable, sit." On Metacritic, the film has a weighted average score of 42 out of 100, based on 30 critics, indicating "mixed or average reviews". Audiences surveyed by CinemaScore gave the film an average grade of "B+" on scale of A+ to F.

Roger Ebert of the Chicago Sun-Times gave the film 3 out of 4 and wrote: "I WANTED it to be a typical romantic comedy starring those two lovable people, Sandra Bullock and Hugh Grant. And it was. And some of the dialogue has a real zing to it. There were wicked little one-liners that slipped in under the radar and nudged the audience in the ribs."
Lisa Schwarzbaum of Entertainment Weekly wrote, that the film "Knows what it needs to do for both its stars, does it, and doesn't make a federal case about it. I'd watch these two together again in a New York minute."

David Rooney of Variety called it: "An affable but undernourished romantic comedy that fails to match the freshness of the actress-producer and writer's previous collaboration, "Miss Congeniality.""

Soundtrack 
The soundtrack music to Two Weeks Notice was released on 28 January 2003.

Punctuation issue
In the best-selling book on punctuation Eats, Shoots & Leaves: The Zero Tolerance Approach to Punctuation, the author Lynne Truss points out that the spelling of the film's title is grammatically incorrect because it is missing an apostrophe (Two Weeks' Notice). The book's original hardcover edition featured Truss in her author's photo, glaring at the poster and holding a marker where the apostrophe should be.

References

External links

 
 
 
 
 Two Weeks Notice at The Numbers

2002 films
2002 romantic comedy films
American romantic comedy films
Castle Rock Entertainment films
Films directed by Marc Lawrence
Films with screenplays by Marc Lawrence
Films set in New York City
Films shot in New Jersey
Films shot in New York (state)
American buddy comedy films
American female buddy films
Village Roadshow Pictures films
Warner Bros. films
Films scored by John Powell
Films produced by Sandra Bullock
2002 directorial debut films
2000s English-language films
2000s American films